Cotoneaster insignis is a species of flowering plant in the family Rosaceae.

Description

References

insignis